The Newhaven ERF (Energy Recovery Facility) is an incinerator, in the town of Newhaven in the English county of East Sussex, for the treatment of up to 210,000 tonnes per annum of the county's municipal solid waste. The facility, built by Veolia Environmental Services, was approved by planners at the Conservative-controlled East Sussex County Council.

The facility treats household waste that cannot be reused, composted or recycled and generates electricity from it. The electricity produced is sold to the National Grid and is enough to supply 25,000 homes.

Construction
Construction of the facility began in April 2008 and was completed in late 2011. The facility became operational in 2012.

See also
List of incinerators in the United Kingdom

References

Waste power stations in England
Buildings and structures in East Sussex